Shane McLeod (born 4 September 1968) is a New Zealand field hockey coach. At the 2008 and 2012 Summer Olympics he coached the New Zealand national field hockey team. He has also coached several clubs in Belgium. At the 2016 Summer Olympics he was the head coach of the Belgium men's national field hockey team that won the silver medal. He was best coach of the year in 2017 and 2018 for his dedication with the Belgian field hockey team. He was the head coach of the Red Lions when they won the world title in 2018, the European Championship in 2019, and the Olympic title in Tokyo 2020. In 2019 he was voted best coach of the year in Belgium.

References

External links
Official 

Shane McLeod at The Hockey Site

Living people
New Zealand field hockey coaches
1968 births
New Zealand Olympic coaches
New Zealand expatriate sportspeople in Belgium